The Angel Makers of Nagyrév ("Tiszazug poison-mixers") were a group of women living in the village of Nagyrév, Hungary, who, between 1914 and 1929, poisoned to death an estimated 40 people. They were supplied arsenic and encouraged to use it for the purpose by a midwife or "wise woman" named Zsuzsanna Fazekas, wife of Gyula Fazekas, née Zsuzsanna Oláh (Fazekas Gyuláné Oláh Zsuzsanna). Their story is the subject of the documentary film The Angelmakers and the film Hukkle.

Crimes
Fazekas was a middle-aged midwife who arrived in Nagyrév in 1911, with her husband already missing without explanation. Between 1911 and 1921, she was imprisoned 10 times for performing illegal abortions, but was consistently acquitted by judges supporting abortion.

In Hungarian society at that time, the future husband of a teenage bride was selected by her family and she was forced to accept her parents' choice. Divorce was not allowed socially, even if the husband was an alcoholic or abusive. During World War I, when able-bodied men were sent to fight for Austria-Hungary, rural Nagyrév was an ideal location for holding Allied prisoners of war. With POWs having limited freedom within the village, the women living there often had one or more foreign lovers while their husbands were away. When the men returned, many of them rejected their wives' affairs and wished to return to their previous way of life, creating a volatile situation. At this time, Fazekas began secretly persuading women who wished to escape this situation to poison their husbands using arsenic made by boiling flypaper and skimming off the lethal residue.

After the initial killing of their husbands, some of the women went on to poison parents who had become a burden to them, or to get hold of their inheritance. Others poisoned their lovers, some even their sons; as the midwife allegedly asked the poisoners, "Why put up with them?"

The first poisoning in Nagyrév took place in 1911; it was not the work of Fazekas. The deaths of other husbands, children, and family members soon followed. The poisoning became a fad, and by the mid-1920s, Nagyrév earned the nickname "the murder district". There were an estimated 45–50 murders over the 18 years that Fazekas lived in the district. She was the closest thing to a doctor the village had and her cousin was the clerk who filed all the death certificates, allowing the murders to go undetected.

Capture

Three conflicting accounts have been cited to explain how the Angel Makers were eventually detected. In one, Szabó, one of the Angel Makers, was caught in the act by two visitors who survived her poisoning attempts. She pointed a finger at a woman with the surname Bukenoveski, who in turn named Fazekas. In another account, a medical student in a neighboring town found high arsenic levels in a body that washed up on the riverbank, leading to an investigation. However, according to Béla Bodó, a Hungarian-American historian and author of the first scholarly book on the subject, the murders were finally made public in 1929 when an anonymous letter to the editor of a small local newspaper accused women from the Tiszazug region of the country of poisoning family members.

The authorities exhumed dozens of corpses from the local cemetery. 34 women and one man were indicted.  Afterwards, 26 of the Angel Makers were tried, among them Susi Oláh. Eight were sentenced to death but only two were executed.  Another 12 received prison sentences.

References

Bibliography

 Gregson, Jessica. The Angel Makers. PaperBooks Ltd. 2007. .
 Newton, Michael. The Encyclopedia of Serial Killers. 2nd edition. Checkmark Books. 2006. . pp. 1–2.
 Bodó, Béla. Tiszazug: A Social History of a Murder Epidemic. Columbia University Press East European Monographs, 2003. .

External links
 Crime Library
 CLEWS The Historic True Crime Blog
 Angelmakers – Film website
 BBC News: Unearthing Hungary husband murders
 Evidence Locker True Crime Podcast: The Angel Makers of Nagyrév | Hungary

1914 murders in Hungary 
1919 murders in Hungary 
1920 murders in Hungary 
1929 murders in Hungary 
1910s in Hungary
1910s murders in Hungary
1920s in Hungary
1920s murders in Hungary
Arsenic
Executed Hungarian female serial killers
Filicides
Health care professionals convicted of murdering patients
Hungarian female murderers
Hungarian female serial killers
Hungarian people convicted of murder
Mariticides
Parricides
People convicted of murder by Hungary
Poisoners